Eric Orr (31 August 1909 – 14 March 1980) was an Australian rules footballer who played with Geelong in the Victorian Football League (VFL).

Orr was recruited from Wycheproof.

He later served in the Australian Army during World War II.

Notes

External links 

1909 births
1980 deaths
Australian rules footballers from Victoria (Australia)
Geelong Football Club players